Richard Goddard-Crawley (born 31 March 1978) is an English retired semi-professional footballer who played as a midfielder in the Football League for Brentford. After his release in 1998, he had a 10-year career in non-League football.

Career

Brentford 
After beginning his youth career in the academy at Premier League club Arsenal in 1994, Goddard-Crawley joined Second Division club Brentford on trial in May 1996 and signed a two-year contract three months later. He was an unused substitute on three occasions, before making his senior debut in the final match of the 1996–97 regular season, as a 78th-minute substitute for Robert Taylor in a 1–0 defeat to Peterborough United. He made two League Cup appearances early in the 1997–98 season, before moving away on loan in October 1997 and returning with a fractured foot one month later. Goddard-Crawley departed Brentford for the final time in March 1998, having made three appearances in just under two years at Griffin Park. He played the majority of his football at the club for the reserve team and made 36 appearances and scored two goals.

Non-League football 
In March 1998, Goddard-Crawley returned to Conference club Woking for a £7,500 fee, after having been on loan at the Kingfield Stadium earlier in the 1997–98 season. Over the next decade he subsequently played in the Conference and Isthmian League for St Albans City, Chesham United, Harrow Borough, Thurrock, Yeading and AFC Hornchurch, before retiring in 2008.

Post-retirement 
After retiring from football, Goddard-Crawley returned to Arsenal as an academy physiotherapist in October 2008. As of February 2020, he was running a physiotherapy business in North London.

Career statistics

Honours 
St Albans City
 Herts Senior Cup: 1999–00

Individual

 Yeading Supporters' Player of the Year: 2006–07
 Yeading Supporters' Player of the Year: 2006–07

References

External links

1978 births
Living people
English footballers
Arsenal F.C. players
Brentford F.C. players
Woking F.C. players
Chesham United F.C. players
St Albans City F.C. players
Harrow Borough F.C. players
Thurrock F.C. players
Yeading F.C. players
Hornchurch F.C. players
English Football League players
National League (English football) players
Arsenal F.C. non-playing staff
Association football physiotherapists
Isthmian League players
Association football central defenders